Rugby union internationals may refer to:

 End-of-year rugby union internationals, played around the month of November
 Mid-year rugby union internationals, played around the month of June